The Socialist Hall in Butte, Montana is one of the few socialist halls remaining in the United States. Erected in 1916, when the Socialist movement was strong in the city, it was active for only a few years until socialism fell out of favor amidst persecution of socialists and labor unionists including the Anaconda Road Massacre and the lynching of Frank Little.

During its brief time of service, the Industrial Workers of the World met here, also holding meetings in Butte's Finlander Hall.

Today a sporting goods shop occupies the first floor of the former Socialist Hall. The building is physically outside the boundaries of the Butte-Anaconda-Walkerville National Historic Landmark District, but is included with it for documentation.

The Socialist Hall building is a two-story building which "is an excellent example of craftsmanship and design in a two-part commercial block style building."  It faces east onto Harrison Avenue with a chocolate colored and beige brick facade.  When nominated, it had about fifty masonry anchor bolts stabilizing the front facade.

See also
 Socialist Labor Party Hall, also listed on the National Register of Historic Places
 National Register of Historic Places listings in Silver Bow County, Montana

References

National Historic Landmarks in Montana
Clubhouses on the National Register of Historic Places in Montana
Buildings and structures completed in 1916
Buildings and structures in Butte, Montana
Socialism in the United States
Historic district contributing properties in Montana
National Register of Historic Places in Silver Bow County, Montana
1916 establishments in Montana